The Victor is a 1932 German comedy film directed by Hans Hinrich and Paul Martin and starring Hans Albers, Käthe von Nagy and Julius Falkenstein. A postal clerk loses his money gambling on horses, but eventually meets and falls in love with a wealthy man's daughter. It premiered on 23 March 1932 at the Gloria-Palast in Berlin.

It was shot at the Babelsberg Studios in Berlin. The film's art direction was by Erich Kettelhut. A separate French-language version Le vainqueur was made, also directed by Hans Hinrich and Paul Martin, with Käthe von Nagy, Jean Murat and Pierre Brasseur.

Cast

References

Bibliography

External links

1932 films
Films of the Weimar Republic
1932 comedy films
German comedy films
1930s German-language films
Films directed by Paul Martin
German horse racing films
Films with screenplays by Billy Wilder
German multilingual films
German black-and-white films
UFA GmbH films
Films produced by Erich Pommer
1932 multilingual films
Films shot at Babelsberg Studios
1930s German films